Dendrophilia may refer to one of the following:

Dendrophilia ramea, a type of coral
Boiga dendrophilia, or Mangrove Snake
Dendrophilia (moth), a moth
Dendrophilia (paraphilia), arousal caused by trees